Alternative 3 is a 1977 British television mockumentary. Only aired once in the United Kingdom, it was later aired in Australia, Canada, and New Zealand as a hoax. Purporting to be an investigation into the UK's contemporary "brain drain", Alternative 3 "uncovers" a plan to make the Moon and Mars habitable in the event of climate change and a terminal environmental catastrophe on Earth.

The programme was originally meant to be aired on April Fools' Day 1977, but its broadcast was delayed to 20 June. Alternative 3 ended with credits for the actors involved in the production and featured interviews with a fictitious American astronaut.

It has been compared to Orson Welles' radio production of The War of the Worlds, as both were science fiction programmes that were misinterpreted as legitimate.

Overview 
The programme was presented as an edition of an Anglia TV series called Science Report. The intended transmission date was 1 April, but it seems that Anglia was unable to obtain an ITV network slot for the programme on that date due to strike action or labour disputes. The script was written by Chris Miles and David Ambrose. Music was supplied by Brian Eno, a portion of his score being released on the album Music for Films (1978). Apart from the presenter Tim Brinton, all the characters in the programme were played by actors who were explicitly credited at the end.

The episode began by detailing the so-called "brain drain": a number of mysterious disappearances and deaths of physicists, engineers, astronomers, and others in related fields. Among the strange deaths reported was that of one "Professor Ballantine" of Jodrell Bank. Before his death, Ballantine delivers a videotape to a friend in the press, but upon playback the tape appears to contain only static.

According to the research presented in the episode, it was hypothesized that the missing scientists were involved in a secret American-Soviet plan in outer space, and further suggested that interplanetary space travel had been possible for much longer than was commonly accepted. The episode featured an Apollo astronaut "Bob Grodin" (played by Shane Rimmer) who claims to have stumbled on a mysterious lunar base during his moonwalk.

It was claimed that scientists had determined that the Earth's surface would be unable to support life for much longer, due to pollution leading to catastrophic climate change. Physicist "Dr Carl Gerstein" (played by Richard Marner) claimed to have proposed in 1957 that there were three alternatives to this problem. The first alternative was the drastic reduction of the human population on Earth. The second alternative was the construction of vast underground shelters to house government officials and a cross section of the population until the climate had stabilised, a solution reminiscent of the finale of Dr Strangelove. The third alternative, the so-called "Alternative 3", was to populate  Mars via a way station on the Moon.

The programme ends with some detective work; acting on information from Grodin, the reporters determine that Ballantine's videotape requires a special decoding device. After locating the decoder, the resulting video turns out to depict a joint American and Soviet landing on the Martian surface in 1962.. In the video, the viewers see the landing on Mars, but the camera focuses on something that moves under the surface of the ground. Then one voice says, "We are in Mars and we have life." In the book, this scene is different: after the landing, we read that the voice says, "We are in Mars and we have air", with no reference to any alien life.

Production 
The programme was made with film stock used at the time to make it appear like a conventional documentary programme. In a 1989 interview, actor Richard Marner (who plays Dr. Carl Gerstein) said he did not rehearse his lines to make the delivery appear as natural as possible.

Reception 
Within minutes of the programme ending, Anglia Television was flooded with telephone calls demanding more information. Callers were told the programme was a hoax. The Times on 21 June reported, "Independent television companies last night received hundreds of protest calls after an Anglia programme, Alternative 3, gave alarming facts about changes in the Earth's atmosphere. It was a hoax, originally intended for April 1st." It also pointed out that several of the characters in the programme were played by well-known actors.

Nick Austin, who was editorial director of Sphere Books when Watkins' adaptation was commissioned and published, writes that the book was the "best chance I'd ever be likely to get to participate in a hoax of truly Guy Grand proportions — the best thing of its kind since Orson Welles' War of the Worlds radio broadcast."

Austin writes that he was both delighted and disturbed by the Alternative 3 controversy, and adds that the reasons "a clever hoax, openly admitted to be such by its creators, should continue to exercise the fascination it so obviously does the best part of a generation after its first appearance is beyond my feeble powers of analysis and explanation."

A more detailed explanation of the hoax is featured in a study of conspiracy theory subculture and literature, A Culture of Conspiracy: Apocalyptic Visions in Contemporary America (2003), wherein Michael Barkun devotes a few pages to Alternative 3.

Barkun writes that "Alternative 3 was clearly a hoax — and not only because it was intended for broadcast on April Fools' Day. The interviews with supposed scientists, astronauts, and others were far too dramatically polished to have been spontaneous, and in any case, the episode's closing credits named the actors who took the roles of interviewees and correspondents. Though artfully produced, the show's counterfeit documentary style could scarcely have been expected to fool many. As an Anglia TV spokesman put it, 'We felt viewers would be fairly sophisticated about it.'"

Barkun notes that television and newspapers were "swamped" with inquiries about Alternative 3 and that Anglia Television's sale of the book rights to Leslie Watkins caused the tale to spread far beyond the United Kingdom.

Books 
In 1978, Leslie Watkins wrote a science fiction book based on the screenplay for the television episode. Watkins had previously written a few moderately successful "suspense thriller" novels, and his Alternative 3 novelization detailed many of the claims presented in the episode. It was published by Sphere Books Ltd, of Gray's Inn Road, London. In the book, many of the fictional characters were replaced with real people. For example, quotes from the fictional astronaut Bob Grodin were attributed to real life astronauts Buzz Aldrin and Edgar Mitchell.

Jim Keith's Casebook on Alternative 3: Ufo's, Secret Societies and World Control argues that some elements of the 1977 broadcast were in fact true.

Ken Mitchell's novel Alternative 3 uses the Alternative 3 scenario as a background to a techno-thriller.

On 20 June 2010, the 33rd anniversary of the original Anglia Television broadcast, an allegedly "unexpurgated" edition of the Alternative 3 text was released as an eBook.

DVD release 
The film was released on DVD in October 2007, together with a 30-minute featurette with presenter Tim Brinton and writers David Ambrose and Christopher Miles who also directed Alternative 3; a production stills gallery; and contemporary press cuttings presented in the form of slowly scrolling rostrum camera shots.

The film is taken from a 16 mm print with optical sound. According to Miles in the featurette, this is his personal copy, and the only one to have survived.

Influence 
Barkun notes that Alternative 3 and the intermittent availability of Watkins' book "lent itself to conspiracist interpretations", and though Alternative 3 did not mention UFOs or extraterrestrials, many of the plans mentioned in Alternative 3 have been featured in later assorted conspiracy theories. Barkun argues that Alternative 3 was important in that its "role in the growth of conspiracy theory lay in a later permutation" related to UFOs and the UFO conspiracy theory. Milton William Cooper, for one, featured similar tales in some of his writings.

An episode of the American radio science fiction anthology Dimension X featured a plot very similar to the later Alternative 3: On 14 July 1950 episode "The Man In the Moon", an employee of the fictional United States "Bureau of Missing Persons" overhears a radio broadcast from a man who claims to be held prisoner on the Moon. The employee investigates, and uncovers the kidnapping of many persons, including scientists and engineers, who are then forced to toil on the Moon by German overseers, who had colonized the Moon in the late 1930s, and who are preparing an invasion and takeover of the Earth. In turn, the movie Iron Sky (2012) also tells the story of Nazi Moon-bases and a planned Earth invasion.

The novel Sold - For a Spaceship (1973) by Philip High is set in the aftermath of a global ecological catastrophe; a ruling elite who escaped into space attempt to return to Earth, but find that they are unable to survive, whereas those left behind have adapted.

Canadian musician Ian Thomas has stated that the lyrics to his 1979 hit "Pilot" were inspired from watching Alternative 3.

The track "Vats of Goo" on the OST for the 1991 video game Fallout is a cover of Alternative 3's theme.

British doom metal band Anathema's 1998 album Alternative 4 was also named after the programme.

Rock band Monster Magnet have a song about the conspiracy, titled "Third Alternative" on their Dopes to Infinity album.

The novel Stark by Ben Elton features a conspiracy of the rich and powerful to escape a doomed Earth which is very similar to that depicted in Alternative 3.

The song "Alternative Three" on the album Karma Had It Coming by Canadian punk rock band The Broomhandles, takes inspiration from the program.

An alternative soundtrack for the film by members of Add N to (X), Stereolab and Hairy Butter was released on Lo Recordings in 2001.

Costa Botes cited Alternative 3 as one of the influences that inspired him to produce the New Zealand mockumentary Forgotten Silver with Peter Jackson.

A character in Richard Linklater's 1991 film Slacker, portrayed by Jerry Delony, claims that Alternative 3 is "absolutely true" and that humans have been on Mars since 1962.

UK punk rock band UFX released a video using allegedly hoax footage from Alternative 3, the Roswell alien autopsy and footage of Nazi flying saucers to accompany the title track of their 2013 album Reverse Engineering.

References

Further reading

External links 

Alternative 3 – The Most Dangerous TV Show Ever Made Anomalies Network article about Alternative 3
Christopher Miles
Forty years on the elaborate television hoax that shocked the world | Anglia – ITV News

April Fools' Day jokes
Films directed by Christopher Miles
Hoaxes in the United Kingdom
1977 hoaxes
Journalistic hoaxes
British mockumentary films
1977 television specials
Television shows produced by Anglia Television